The men's doubles tennis event at the 2014 Asian Games took place at the Yeorumul Tennis Courts, Incheon, South Korea from 24 September to 29 September 2014.

Schedule
All times are Korea Standard Time (UTC+09:00)

Results
Legend
WO — Won by walkover

Final

Top half

Bottom half

References
 Draw

External links
Official website

Tennis at the 2014 Asian Games